Loddington may refer to:

 Loddington, Leicestershire, England
 Loddington, Northamptonshire, England
 a species of apple, see :Commons:Category:Loddington (apple)

See also 
 Luddington (disambiguation)